The East Strickland or Strickland River languages are a family of Papuan languages.

Languages
The East Strickland languages actually form a language continuum. Shaw (1986) recognizes six languages, which are:
Upper: Fembe (Agala), Konai
Odoodee (Tomu)
Central/Middle: Gobasi (Nomad), Kubo, Samo (Daba)

Gobasi, Odoodee and Samo, but especially Gobasi, are also known as "Nomad".

Pronouns
Pronouns are:

{|
! !!sg!!du!!pl
|-
!1
|*na, *ã||*o-li, *a-la||*oi
|-
!2
|*nõ||*nĩ-le||*nĩ
|-
!3
|*yõ||*i-le||*yã, *di
|}

Vocabulary comparison
The following basic vocabulary words are from McElhanon & Voorhoeve (1970), Shaw (1973), and Shaw (1986), as cited in the Trans-New Guinea database:

Evolution
Supposed East Strickland reflexes of proto-Trans-New Guinea (pTNG) etyma are:

Samo language:
(da)subu ‘ashes’ < *sumbu
si- ‘burn’ < *nj(a,e,i)-
na- ‘eat’ < *na-
magara ‘mouth’ < *maŋgat[a]
korofu ‘skin’ < *(ŋg,k)a(n,t)apu
mere(ma) ‘tongue’ < *me(l,n)e
mini ‘nose’ < *mundu

Bibo language:
(da)suf ‘ashes’ < *sumbu

Agala language:
fulu(ma) ali ‘to fly’ < *pululu-

References

 
Languages of Papua New Guinea
Strickland–Soari languages